Total is the debut album by American female R&B trio Total. It was released by Bad Boy Records and Arista Records on January 30, 1996 in the United States. Chiefly produced by Bad Boy head Sean "Puffy" Combs, the album peaked at number 23 on the US Billboard 200 and reached the top five of the US Top R&B/Hip-Hop Albums. Total was certified platinum by the Recording Industry Association of America (RIAA) and spawned the hit singles "Can't You See", "No One Else", "Kissin' You"  and "Do You Think About Us"/"When Boy Meets Girl".

Critical reception

Allmusic senior editor Stephen Thomas Erlewine found that "while the album is simply too long to sustain the quality" of their previous "singles "See" and "No One Else," most of the record is filled with deep, seductive funk that follows through on the group's promise." Entertainment Weeklys Dimitri Ehrlich wrote that "with a buttery delivery and enough sass to kill an elephant, this trio of hip-hop/soul vixens gives TLC good cause to be frightened. Brimming with irresistibly funky loops and gritty grooves, the self-titled Total is a pleasure from start to finish. Rap assists from label mate The Notorious B.I.G. are the cherry on top." Connie Johnson from The Los Angeles Times felt that "the three singers themselves generate little heat. The vocals on the best cuts, “Can't You See” and “Do You Think About Us?,” mostly evoke Faith Evans and T-Boz of TLC. Except for the lasciviousness of “Who Is This,” Total doesn't distinguish itself from other divas."

Track listing

Sample credits
"Do You Know" contains a sample from "Same Beat (Part 1)" as performed by Fred Wesley and The J.B.'s.
"No One Else" contains a sample from "South Bronx" as performed by KRS-1.
"Can't You See" contains elements from "The Payback" as performed by James Brown.
"Someone like You" contains a sample from "Save their Souls" as performed by Hamilton Bohannon.
"Tell Me" contains a sample from "Help Somebody Please" as performed by The O'Jays.
"Love Is All We Need" contains excerpts from "Atomic Dog" as performed by George Clinton.
"Don't Ever Change" samples "Computer Love" as performed by Zapp.
"Spend Some Time" contains a sample from "Love TKO" as performed by Teddy Pendergrass.
"When Boy Meets Girl" incorporates re-recorded portions of "Love You Inside Out" as written and performed by The Bee Gees.

Credits

Charles "Prince Charles" Alexander – Flute, Mixing
Eddie Alford – Guitar
Bob Brockman – Mixing
Gerry Brown – Mixing
Sean "Puffy" Combs – Executive Producer, Producer, Remixing, Voices
Lane Craven – Engineer
Da Brat – Rap
Stephen Dent – Engineer
Chad "Dr. Seuss" Elliott – Producer
Dan Evans – Production Coordination
Guzman (Constance Hansen and Russell Peacock) – Photography
Chad Hugo – Producer
Stevie J. – Producer
Julian Jackson – Drums, Engineer, Keyboards, Percussion, Programming
Rodney Jerkins – Remixing
D. Jones – Vocals (Background)
Steve Jordan – Producer
Paul Logus – Engineer, Mixing
Pam Long – Voices
Tammy Lucas – Vocal Producer
Keith M. – Vocals (Background)

Tony Maserati – Engineer, Mixing
Keenya Mauldin – Hair Stylist
Alisha Melvin – Hair Stylist
Herb Middleton – Keyboards
Nasheim Myrick – Engineer
Axel Niehaus – Engineer, Mixing
Jean Claude "Poke" Olivier – Producer
Sybil Pennix – Assistant Producer, Stylist, Executive Producer
Herb Powers – Mastering
Terri Robinson – Producer, Vocals (Background)
Raphael Saadiq – Guitar (Bass), Producer, Vocals (Background)
LaTrice Shaw – Production Coordination
Rashad Smith – Producer
Eric Spearman – Make-Up
Kevin Thomas – Engineer
Chucky Thompson – Guitar, Keyboards, Producer
Total – Vocals (Background)
Richard Travali – Engineer
Pharrell Williams – Producer
Doug Wilson – Engineer

Charts

Weekly charts

Year-end charts

Certifications

References

Total (group) albums
1996 debut albums
Albums produced by Sean Combs
Albums produced by Rashad Smith
Albums produced by Rodney Jerkins
Albums produced by Raphael Saadiq
Albums produced by the Neptunes
Bad Boy Records albums